Stereo Rodeo is the sixth studio album by the American bluegrass rock band Rusted Root.

Reception

The editorial staff of AllMusic Guide gave this album 3.5 out of five stars, with reviewer Stephen Thomas Erlewine, noting that this release combines the pop music elements of Welcome to My Party with the band's more traditional worldbeat influences, characterizing this album as "a way to get the band back to their roots without drawing attention to any machinations that get them there".

Track listing
All songs written by Michael Glabicki except where noted.
 "Dance in the Middle" – 4:51
 "Suspicious Minds" (Mark James) – 5:06
 "Weary Bones" – 3:37
 "Bad Son" – 3:19
 "Give You the Grace" – 5:50
 "Driving One" (Rusted Root) – 2:27
 "Stereo Rodeo" – 3:57
 "Driving Two" (Rusted Root) – 1:53
 "Animals Love Touch" – 3:15
 "Garbage Man" – 4:23
 "Crucible Glow" – 4:04

Personnel
Rusted Root
Michael Glabicki – lead vocals, guitar, percussion, drums (Bad Son)
Liz Berlin – vocals, percussion
Patrick Norman – vocals, bass, percussion, guitar (Dance In The Middle), horn arrangements (Crucible Glow)
Jason Miller – drums, percussion, timpani
Preach Freedom – percussion, vocals
Colter Harper – electric guitar, percussion
Dirk Miller – electric guitar, banjo, mandolin

References

External links

2009 albums
Rusted Root albums